Glebe is an area of land within an ecclesiastical parish used to support a parish priest.

Glebe or The Glebe may also refer to:

Places

Australia
Glebe, Tasmania, a suburb of Hobart
Glebe, New South Wales, a suburb of Sydney
Glebe Park, Canberra, a public park

Barbados 
The Glebe, Barbados, a village in Saint George

Canada
The Glebe, a historic neighbourhood in Ottawa, Ontario

Northern Ireland
Glebe, County Antrim, a townland in County Antrim
Glebe, County Armagh, a townland in County Armagh
Glebe, County Down, a townland in County Down
Glebe, County Londonderry, a townland in County Londonderry
Glebe, County Tyrone, a small village

New Zealand
The Glebe (Lower Hutt), one of the oldest buildings in Wellington

Republic of Ireland
Glebe, Ballyloughloe, a townland in Ballyloughloe civil parish, barony of Clonlonan, County Westmeath
Glebe, Bunown, a townland in Bunown civil parish, barony of Kilkenny West, County Westmeath
Glebe, County Donegal, a townland
Glebe, Killucan, a townland in Killucan civil parish, barony of Farbill, County Westmeath
Glebe, Leny, a townland in Leny civil parish, barony of Corkaree, County Westmeath
Glebe, Piercetown, a townland in Piercetown civil parish, barony of Rathconrath, County Westmeath
Glebe, Taghmon, a townland in Taghmon civil parish, barony of Corkaree, County Westmeath

There are over 100 townlands in Ireland with the name Glebe.

United States
The Glebe (Amherst, Virginia), a historic house
The Glebe (Arlington, Virginia), a historic house
The Glebe (Yonkers, New York), a historic Rectory, site of Revolutionary war skirmishes
Glebe, West Virginia, an unincorporated community
Glebe Creek, a river in Maryland
Glebe Road, a highway in Arlington, Virginia

Other uses 
Glebe terrier, a document listing ecclesiastical glebes
The Glebe (literary magazine), published in the United States in 1913–1914
Glebe (rugby league team), the first Rugby League club formed in Australia
Glebe Collegiate Institute, a secondary school in Ottawa, Canada
Glebe Park, Brechin, a multi-use stadium in Scotland

See also
Glebe House (disambiguation)